Joachim Willén (born August 23, 1972) is a triathlete from Sweden.

Willen competed at the first Olympic triathlon at the 2000 Summer Olympics.  He took thirty-fifth place with a total time of 1:51:40.80.

References 

1972 births
Living people
Swedish male triathletes
Olympic triathletes of Sweden
Triathletes at the 2000 Summer Olympics
20th-century Swedish people
21st-century Swedish people